In algebra, an absolute value (also called a valuation, magnitude, or norm, although "norm" usually refers to a specific kind of absolute value on a field) is a function which measures the "size" of elements in a field or integral domain. More precisely, if D is an integral domain, then an absolute value is any mapping |x| from D to the real numbers R satisfying:

It follows from these axioms that |1| = 1 and |-1| = 1. Furthermore, for every positive integer n,

|n| = |1 + 1 + ... + 1 (n times)| = |−1 − 1 − ... − 1 (n times)| ≤ n.

The classical "absolute value" is one in which, for example, |2|=2, but many other functions fulfill the requirements stated above, for instance the square root of the classical absolute value (but not the square thereof).

An absolute value induces a metric (and thus a topology) by

Examples 
The standard absolute value on the integers.
The standard absolute value on the complex numbers.
The p-adic absolute value on the rational numbers.

Types of absolute value 
The trivial absolute value is the absolute value with |x|=0 when x=0 and |x|=1 otherwise.  Every integral domain can carry at least the trivial absolute value. The trivial value is the only possible absolute value on a finite field because any non-zero element can be raised to some power to yield 1.

If an absolute value satisfies the stronger property |x + y| ≤ max(|x|, |y|) for all x and y, then |x| is called an ultrametric or non-Archimedean absolute value, and otherwise an Archimedean absolute value.

Places 
If |x|1 and |x|2 are two absolute values on the same integral domain D, then the two absolute values are equivalent if |x|1 < 1 if and only if |x|2 < 1 for all x. If two nontrivial absolute values are equivalent, then for some exponent e we have |x|1e = |x|2 for all x. Raising an absolute value to a power less than 1 results in another absolute value, but raising to a power greater than 1 does not necessarily result in an absolute value. (For instance, squaring the usual absolute value on the real numbers yields a function which is not an absolute value because it violates the rule |x+y| ≤ |x|+|y|.) Absolute values up to equivalence, or in other words, an equivalence class of absolute values, is called a place.

Ostrowski's theorem states that the nontrivial places of the rational numbers Q are the ordinary absolute value and the p-adic absolute value for each prime p.  For a given prime p, any rational number q can be written as pn(a/b), where a and b are integers not divisible by p and n is an integer. The p-adic absolute value of q is

Since the ordinary absolute value and the p-adic absolute values are absolute values according to the definition above, these define places.

Valuations 

If for some ultrametric absolute value and any base b > 1, we define ν(x) = −logb|x| for x ≠ 0 and ν(0) = ∞, where ∞ is ordered to be greater than all real numbers, then we obtain a function from D to R ∪ {∞}, with the following properties:

 ν(x) = ∞ ⇒ x = 0,
 ν(xy) = ν(x)+ν(y),
 ν(x + y) ≥ min(ν(x), ν(y)).

Such a function is known as a valuation in the terminology of Bourbaki, but other authors use the term valuation for absolute value and then say exponential valuation instead of valuation.

Completions 
Given an integral domain D with an absolute value, we can define the Cauchy sequences of elements of D with respect to the absolute value by requiring that for every ε > 0 there is a positive integer N such that for all integers m, n > N one has |xm  − xn| < ε. Cauchy sequences form a ring under pointwise addition and multiplication. One can also define null sequences as sequences (an) of elements of D such that |an| converges to zero. Null sequences are a prime ideal in the ring of Cauchy sequences, and the quotient ring is therefore an integral domain. The domain D is embedded in this quotient ring, called the completion of D with respect to the absolute value |x|.

Since fields are integral domains, this is also a construction for the completion of a field with respect to an absolute value. To show that the result is a field, and not just an integral domain, we can either show that null sequences form a maximal ideal, or else construct the inverse directly. The latter can be easily done by taking, for all nonzero elements of the quotient ring, a sequence starting from a point beyond the last zero element of the sequence. Any nonzero element of the quotient ring will differ by a null sequence from such a sequence, and by taking pointwise inversion we can find a representative inverse element.

Another theorem of Alexander Ostrowski has it that any field complete with respect to an Archimedean absolute value is isomorphic to either the real or the complex numbers, and the valuation is equivalent to the usual one.  The Gelfand-Tornheim theorem states that any field with an Archimedean valuation is isomorphic to a subfield of C, the valuation being equivalent to the usual absolute value on C.

Fields and integral domains 
If D is an integral domain with absolute value |x|, then we may extend the definition of the absolute value to the field of fractions of D by setting

On the other hand, if F is a field with ultrametric absolute value |x|, then the set of elements of F such that |x| ≤ 1 defines a valuation ring, which is a subring D of F such that for every nonzero element x of F, at least one of x or x−1 belongs to D. Since F is a field, D has no zero divisors and is an integral domain. It has a unique maximal ideal consisting of all x such that |x| < 1, and is therefore a local ring.

Notes

References 

 
 Chapter 9, paragraph 1 "Absolute values".
 

Abstract algebra